Poppies Martinez (born August 19, 1983) is a Native American professional mixed martial artist of the Tachi Yokuts tribe currently competing in the Lightweight division of Bellator. A professional competitor since 2003, he has also formerly competed for the California-based promotions, the WEC, Palace Fighting Championship, and Tachi Palace Fights.

Background
Born and raised in Lemoore, California, Martinez competed in wrestling at Lemoore High School. Martinez has also trained in Kenpo Karate and holds a black belt.

Mixed martial arts career

Early career: World Extreme Cagefighting
Martinez began training in mixed martial arts at the age of 19 and made his professional debut in 2003 for the WEC. Martinez fought exclusively for the promotion until 2006.

Palace Fighting Championship and Tachi Palace Fights
From 2007 to 2014, Martinez fought mainly for Palace Fighting Championship, and after the organization's end, Tachi Palace Fights. Both organizations held most of their events in Tachi Palace Hotel & Casino at Martinez's hometown in Lemoore, California.

Martinez fought for PFC Lightweight Championship on March 22, 2007 at PFC 2 against Shad Smith. He lost via submission due to a guillotine choke in the third round.

Martinez was scheduled to rematch Shad Smith on October 18, 2007 at PFC 4 for the PFC Lightweight Championship. However, Smith was forced to pull out of the bout after being medically suspended by CSAC. Martinez was rescheduled to face Brandon Jinnies at the same event for the PFC Interim Lightweight Championship. He won via TKO early in the first round and became the PFC interim lightweight title holder.

Once again, Martinez fought for the PFC Lightweight Championship on January 17, 2008 at PFC 6 against Diego Saraiva and was defeated via submission due to a rear-naked choke in the first round.

Martinez faced David Mitchell on July 9, 2010 at TPF 5: Stars and Strikes for the welterweight title. He lost via technical submission due to a triangle choke early in the first round.

Martinez faced Christos Giagos on August 22, 2013 at TPF 16: The Return for the vacant TPF Lightweight Championship. Martinez defeated Giagos via submission due to a guillotine choke in the first round and became the new Lightweight Champion.

Martinez also faced Chris Culley on February 6, 2014 at TPF 18: Martinez vs. Culley for the vacant TPF Featherweight Championship. He won via submission due to an anaconda choke in the first round and became the only fighter to hold two TPF belts simultaneously.

Bellator MMA
Martinez made his promotional debut on October 4, 2013 at Bellator 102 against Brandon Girtz. He lost via submission due to an armbar early in the first round.

Martinez next faced Josh Smith on April 11, 2014 at Bellator 116. He won via submission due to a guillotine choke at 3:50 of round one.

In his third fight within the promotion, Martinez faced Bubba Jenkins at Bellator 122 on July 25, 2014. He lost the fight via first-round TKO.

Martinez faced Julio Cesar Neves on September 19, 2014 at Bellator 125. He lost via TKO in the first round.

Personal life
Martinez, who is married, has eight children and his brother, Andrew "Mickey" Martinez, is also a professional mixed martial artist who has competed for Tachi Palace Fights. Mickey competes in the Heavyweight division.

Championships and accomplishments

Mixed martial arts
 Tachi Palace Fights
 TPF Lightweight Championship (One time; current)
 TPF Featherweight Championship (One time; current)
 Palace Fighting Championship
 PFC Interim Lightweight Championship (One time)

Mixed martial arts record

|-
| Loss
| align=center | 29–11 (1)
| Julio Cesar Neves
| TKO (punches)
| Bellator 125
| 
| align=center | 1
| align=center | 2:16
| Fresno, California, United States
| 
|-
| Loss
| align=center | 29–10 (1)
| Bubba Jenkins
| TKO (punches)
| Bellator 122
| 
| align=center | 1
| align=center | 4:10
| Temecula, California, United States
|
|-
| Win
| align=center | 29–9 (1)
| Josh Smith
| Submission (guillotine choke)
| Bellator 116
| 
| align=center | 1
| align=center | 3:50
| Temecula, California, United States
| 
|-
| Win
| align=center | 28–9 (1)
| Chris Culley
| Submission (anaconda choke)
| Tachi Palace Fights 18: Martinez vs. Culley
| 
| align=center | 1
| align=center | 3:31
| Lemoore, California, United States
| 
|-
| Loss
| align=center | 27–9 (1)
| Brandon Girtz
| Submission (armbar)
| Bellator 102
| 
| align=center | 1
| align=center | 1:20
| Visalia, California, United States
|
|-
| Win
| align=center | 27–8 (1)
| Christos Giagos
| Submission (guillotine choke)
| Tachi Palace Fights 16: The Return
| 
| align=center | 1
| align=center | 4:27
| Lemoore, California, United States
| 
|-
| Win
| align=center | 26–8 (1)
| John Bond
| Submission
| Gladiator Challenge: Battleground
| 
| align=center | 1
| align=center | 1:10
| San Jacinto, California, United States
|
|-
| Win
| align=center | 25–8 (1)
| Aaron King
| Submission (neck crank)
| Gladiator Challenge: Super Fight Night
| 
| align=center | 1
| align=center | 0:51
| Lincoln, California, United States
|
|-
| Win
| align=center | 24–8 (1)
| Fernando Bernstein
| Decision (unanimous)
| Tachi Palace Fights 15: Collision Course
| 
| align=center | 3
| align=center | 5:00
| Lemoore, California, United States
|
|-
| Win
| align=center | 23–8 (1)
| Mike Ryan
| TKO (punches)
| Gladiator Challenge: Heat Returns
| 
| align=center | 1
| align=center | 1:46
| San Jacinto, California, United States
|
|-
| Win
| align=center | 22–8 (1)
| Alec Borilia
| TKO (punches)
| Gladiator Challenge
| 
| align=center | 1
| align=center | 0:50
| San Diego, California, United States
|
|-
| Win
| align=center | 21–8 (1)
| Jason Drake
| Submission (heel hook)
| Tachi Palace Fights 14: Validation
| 
| align=center | 1
| align=center | 1:48
| Lemoore, California, United States
|
|-
| Win
| align=center | 20–8 (1)
| Raymond Doxie
| TKO (doctor stoppage)
| Gladiator Challenge: World Class
| 
| align=center | 2
| align=center | 1:53
| Lincoln, California, United States
|
|-
| Loss
| align=center | 19–8 (1)
| Tony Llamas
| Submission (guillotine choke)
| Tachi Palace Fights 13: Unfinished Business
| 
| align=center | 1
| align=center | 1:00
| Lemoore, California, United States
|
|-
| Loss
| align=center | 19–7 (1)
| David Mitchell
| Technical submission (triangle choke)
| TPF 5: Stars and Strikes
| 
| align=center | 1
| align=center | 1:32
| Lemoore, California, United States
| 
|-
| Win
| align=center | 19–6 (1)
| Darren Crisp
| Submission (armbar)
| TPF 4: Cinco de Mayhem
| 
| align=center | 1
| align=center | 2:46
| Lemoore, California, United States
|
|-
| Loss
| align=center | 18–6 (1)
| Daniel Romero
| Submission (armbar)
| Gladiator Challenge: Chain Reaction
| 
| align=center | 1
| align=center | 2:59
| Placerville, California, United States
|
|-
| Win
| align=center | 18–5 (1)
| Sergio Salcido
| Submission (guillotine choke)
| TPF 1: Tachi Palace Fights 1
| 
| align=center | 2
| align=center | 3:21
| Lemoore, California, United States
|
|-
| Win
| align=center | 17–5 (1)
| Tony Llamas
| Submission (armbar)
| PFC 11: All In
| 
| align=center | 1
| align=center | 1:51
| Lemoore, California, United States
|
|-
| Win
| align=center | 16–5 (1)
| Sergio Cortez
| Decision (unanimous)
| PFC 10: Explosive
| 
| align=center | 3
| align=center | 3:00
| Lemoore, California, United States
|
|-
| Loss
| align=center | 15–5 (1)
| Sergio Cortez
| TKO (injury)
| PFC 8: A Night of Champions
| 
| align=center | 1
| align=center | 2:57
| Lemoore, California, United States
|
|-
| Win
| align=center | 15–4 (1)
| Jarod Saenz
| Submission (guillotine choke)
| PFC 7.5: New Blood
| 
| align=center | 1
| align=center | 0:31
| Porterville, California, United States
|
|-
| Loss
| align=center | 14–4 (1)
| Diego Saraiva
| Submission (rear-naked choke)
| PFC 6: No Retreat, No Surrender
| 
| align=center | 1
| align=center | 2:08
| Lemoore, California, United States
| 
|-
| Win
| align=center | 14–3 (1)
| Billy Terry
| Submission (kimura)
| Independent Event
| 
| align=center | 1
| align=center | 2:35
| Lemoore, California, United States
|
|-
| Win
| align=center | 13–3 (1)
| Aaron Maldonado
| Submission (guillotine choke)
| PFC 5: Beatdown at 4 Bears
| 
| align=center | 1
| align=center | 1:22
| New Town, North Dakota, United States
| 
|-
| Win
| align=center | 12–3 (1)
| Brandon Jinnies
| TKO (punches)
| PFC 4: Project Complete
| 
| align=center | 1
| align=center | 1:23
| Lemoore, California, United States
| 
|-
| Win
| align=center | 11–3 (1)
| Billy Terry
| Submission (rear-naked choke)
| Primal MMA: The Next Level
| 
| align=center | 1
| align=center | 2:00
| Tijuana, Baja California, Mexico
|
|-
| Loss
| align=center | 10–3 (1)
| Shad Smith
| Submission (guillotine choke)
| PFC 2: Fast and Furious
| 
| align=center | 3
| align=center | 1:10
| Lemoore, California, United States
| 
|-
| Win
| align=center | 10–2 (1)
| Josh Gardner
| Decision (unanimous)
| PFC 1: King of the Ring
| 
| align=center | 3
| align=center | 3:00
| Lemoore, California, United States
|
|-
| Win
| align=center | 9–2 (1)
| Robert Breslin
| Submission (guillotine choke)
| WEC 24: Full Force
| 
| align=center | 1
| align=center | 0:52
| Lemoore, California, United States
|
|-
| Win
| align=center | 8–2 (1)
| Gigo Jara
| Submission (rear-naked choke)
| WEC 23: Hot August Fights
| 
| align=center | 2
| align=center | 3:52
| Lemoore, California, United States
|
|-
| Win
| align=center | 7–2 (1)
| Troy Miller
| Submission (armbar)
| WEC 22: The Hitmen
| 
| align=center | 1
| align=center | 0:50
| Lemoore, California, United States
|
|-
| Loss
| align=center | 6–2 (1)
| Cory Cass
| Submission (armbar)
| WEC 20: Cinco de Mayhem
| 
| align=center | 1
| align=center | 0:47
| Lemoore, California, United States
|
|-
| NC
| align=center | 6–1 (1)
| Robert Breslin
| No contest (groin strike)
| WEC 17: Halloween Fury 4
| 
| align=center | 1
| align=center | 0:23
| Lemoore, California, United States
| 
|-
| Loss
| align=center | 6–1
| Cole Escovedo
| TKO (leg injury)
| WEC 15: Judgment Day
| 
| align=center | 2
| align=center | 1:05
| Lemoore, California, United States
| 
|-
| Win
| align=center | 6–0
| Joe Martin
| TKO (punches)
| WEC 12: Halloween Fury 3
| 
| align=center | 2
| align=center | 4:41
| Lemoore, California, United States
|
|-
| Win
| align=center | 5–0
| Gabriel Cruz
| Submission (punches)
| WEC 10: Bragging Rights
| 
| align=center | 1
| align=center | 0:30
| Lemoore, California, United States
|
|-
| Win
| align=center | 4–0
| Eric Ramirez
| TKO (punches)
| WEC 9: Cold Blooded
| 
| align=center | 1
| align=center | 3:15
| Lemoore, California, United States
|
|-
| Win
| align=center | 3–0
| A.J. Wieman
| Submission (rear-naked choke)
|  WEC 8: Halloween Fury 2
| 
| align=center | 1
| align=center | 2:01
| Lemoore, California, United States
|
|-
| Win
| align=center | 2–0
| Johnny Fadella
| TKO (knees)
| WEC 7: This Time It's Personal
| 
| align=center | 1
| align=center | 0:51
| Lemoore, California, United States
|
|-
| Win
| align=center | 1–0
| Erick Husbands
| KO (punches)
| WEC 6: Return of a Legend
| 
| align=center | 1
| align=center | 0:10
| Lemoore, California, United States
|

Professional boxing record
{| class="wikitable" style="text-align:center;"
| style="text-align:center;" colspan="8" | 3 Wins (1 knockout, 2 decisions),  0 Losses, 0 Draws
|-
| align=center style="border-style: none none solid solid; background: #e3e3e3" | Res.
| align=center style="border-style: none none solid solid; background: #e3e3e3" | Record
| align=center style="border-style: none none solid solid; background: #e3e3e3" | Opponent
| align=center style="border-style: none none solid solid; background: #e3e3e3" | Type
| align=center style="border-style: none none solid solid; background: #e3e3e3" | Rd., Time
| align=center style="border-style: none none solid solid; background: #e3e3e3" | Date
| align=center style="border-style: none none solid solid; background: #e3e3e3" | Location
| align=center style="border-style: none none solid solid; background: #e3e3e3" | Notes
|- align=center
| Win
| align=center | 3–0 || align=left |  Jovanni Rubio
| UD
| 4
| 2009-03-21
| align=left |  Playboy Mansion, Beverly Hills, California, United States
| align=left | 
|- align=center
| Win
| align=center | 2–0 || align=left |  Yonas Gebreegziabher
| MD
| 4
| 2009-02-06
| align=left |  Tachi Palace Hotel & Casino, Lemoore, California, United States
| align=left | 
|- align=center
| Win
| align=center | 1–0 || align=left |  Ben Witthar
| TKO
| 1 (4), 1:32
| 2008-10-23
| align=left |  Tachi Palace Hotel & Casino, Lemoore, California, United States
| align=left | 
|- align=center

See also
 List of male mixed martial artists
 List of current Bellator fighters

References

1983 births
Living people
People from Lemoore, California
Native American sportspeople
Native American people from California
Yokuts
American male mixed martial artists
Mixed martial artists from California
Lightweight mixed martial artists
Mixed martial artists utilizing American Kenpo
Mixed martial artists utilizing boxing
Mixed martial artists utilizing wrestling
Boxers from California
American male boxers
American male karateka
American male sport wrestlers
Amateur wrestlers